David Mays (December 3, 1910 – June 23, 1993) was an American Negro league outfielder in the 1930s.

A native of Leggett, Texas, Mays played for the Kansas City Monarchs in 1937. In 17 recorded games, he posted 14 hits in 61 plate appearances. Mays died in Houston, Texas in 1993 at age 82.

References

External links
 and Seamheads

1910 births
1993 deaths
Kansas City Monarchs players
Baseball outfielders
Baseball players from Texas
People from Polk County, Texas
20th-century African-American sportspeople